Jabara may refer to:

Jabara (citrus), the plant and fruit of the Japanese citrus family
Jabara (instrument), a type of cymbal associated with the Korean musical tradition Daechwita
Jabara, Estonia, a village in Estonia
Halil-Salim Jabara (1913–1999), Israeli Arab politician
Hussniya Jabara (born 1958), Israeli politician
James Jabara (1923–1966), also known as "Jabby" Jabara, American aviator and jet fighter ace
Jabara Award, a United States Air Force Academy award for airmanship
Colonel James Jabara Airport, an airport at Wichita, Kansas, U.S.
Paul Jabara (1948–1992), American actor, singer, and songwriter 
Jabara Williams (born 1989), American footballer
Jubur (Arabic: جبور‎‎), sometimes Jabara, the largest Arab tribe in Iraq